Axis Mutatis is an album by the electronic dance music group The Shamen which was released in 1995. The album did not receive as much positive feedback as their previous album, Boss Drum or was as popular as it, but Axis Mutatis still remained a fairly successful release, with the band eventually releasing four music videos for it. A Deep Dish remix of "Transamazonia" appeared on the WipEout soundtrack.

The initial release of Axis Mutatis contained an additional instrumental album, Arbor Bona Arbor Mala.

Critical reception
British magazine Music Week wrote, "The singalong techno pop is in full effect once more. This one needs a few listens before the hooks sink in, but the blend of ambience, beats and melodies finally wins over."

Track listing

Axis Mutatis
 "Destination Eschaton"  – 3:55
 "Transamazonia"  – 3:52
 "Conquistador"  – 3:58
 "MK2A (Dedicated to Nation of Hawaii)"  – 4:05
 "Neptune"  – 4:16
 "Prince of Popocatapetl"  – 6:01
 "Heal (The Separation)"  – 3:55
 "Persephone's Quest"  – 5:05
 "Moment"  – 4:00
 "Axis Mundi"  – 7:04a. "Tellos"b. "Xibalba"c. "Nemeton"d. "Eternal Return"
 "Eschaton Omega (Deep Melodic Techno Mix)"  – 3:37
 "Agua Azul  – 11:23
 "S2 Translation"  – 3:31

Arbor Bona Arbor Mala
 Asymptotic Eschaton – 0:48
 Sefirotic Axis – 6:52
 Entraterrestrial – 9:38
 Demeter – 4:28
 Beneath the Underworld – 3:34
 Xochipili's Return – 8:28
 Rio Negro – 3:16
 Above the Otherworld – 1:21
 A Moment in Dub – 9:20
 Pizarro in Paradise – 6:02
 West of the Underworld – 10:14
 Anticipation Eschaton (Be Ready for the Storm) – 4:43
 Out in the Styx – 3:08

References

1995 albums
The Shamen albums
One Little Independent Records albums